Tommy Mandel (born June 2, 1949) is a keyboardist most notable for playing with Bryan Adams from 1981 to 1998, starting with the album You Want It You Got It.

Life and career
Prior to joining Bryan Adams' band, Mandel released a self-titled solo EP.

He has also played with Dire Straits, John Waite, and Lydia Canaan, among many others.

Partial discography

Solo
 Tommy Mandel EP (1981)
 Mello Magic LP (2018)
 Music For Insomniacs LP (2020)

With Bryan Adams
 You Want It You Got It
 Cuts Like a Knife
 Reckless
 Into the Fire
 Live! Live! Live!
 Waking Up the Neighbours
 So Far So Good
 The Best of Me
 Anthology 1980–2005

With Dire Straits
 Alchemy: Dire Straits Live
 Money for Nothing

With Ian Hunter
 Welcome to the Club
 Short Back 'n' Sides
 All of the Good Ones Are Taken
 Yui Orta

With The Clash
 Combat Rock
 Sound System

With Bon Jovi
 7800° Fahrenheit

With David Johansen
 In Style
 Here Comes the Night

With Peter Wolf
 Come As you Are

With Little Steven
 Freedom – No Compromise

With Nils Lofgren
 Flip

With The B-52s
 Cosmic Thing

With John Waite
 Mask of Smiles
 Rover's Return

With Cyndi Lauper
 A Night to Remember

With The Pretenders
 Get Close

With Tina Turner
 Break Every Rule

With Ellen Foley
 Night Out
 Another Breath

With Elliott Murphy
 Affairs
 Change Will Come

With Hilly Michaels
 Calling All Girls

References

External links
 

20th-century American keyboardists
1949 births
Living people
Musicians from New York City